The Asociación Nacional de Muchachas Guías de Guatemala (ANMG; roughly National Girl Guide Association of Guatemala) is the national Guiding organization of Guatemala. It serves 980 members (as of 2003). Founded in 1935, the girls-only organization became an associate member of the World Association of Girl Guides and Girl Scouts in 1957 and a full member in 1969.

Program
The association is divided in five sections according to age:
 Abeja - ages 4 to 6
 Caperucita - ages 7 to 9
 Guía pequeña - ages 10 to 12
 Guía intermedia - ages 13 to 15
 Guía mayor - ages 16 to 18

See also
 Asociación de Scouts de Guatemala

External links 
www.guiasguatemala.org

Sources

World Association of Girl Guides and Girl Scouts member organizations
Scouting and Guiding in Guatemala
Youth organizations established in 1935